Zaratha muricicoma is a moth of the family Agonoxenidae. It was described by Lord Walsingham in 1891 and is found in western Africa.

References

Moths described in 1891
Zaratha
Moths of Africa